Artur Rozalski (born 20 March 1978) is a Polish rower. He competed at the 2000 Summer Olympics and the 2004 Summer Olympics.

References

1978 births
Living people
Polish male rowers
Olympic rowers of Poland
Rowers at the 2000 Summer Olympics
Rowers at the 2004 Summer Olympics
Sportspeople from Toruń